Victoria House may refer to:

 Victoria House, Greenwich, a historic school building originally constructed in 1909 for the Royal Army Medical Corps
 Victoria House, London, a building on Bloomsbury Square, constructed in the 1920s
 Victoria House (Victoria University of Wellington), a residential college in New Zealand, established 1907
 Victoria House (film), a 2009 Bollywood film

See also
 Victorian house, an architectural style